Hat Yai is a district (amphoe) of Songkhla province, southern Thailand.

Geography
Neighboring districts are (from the west clockwise): Khuan Kalong of Satun province; Rattaphum, Bang Klam, Khuan Niang, Singhanakhon, Mueang Songkhla, Na Mom, Chana, Sadao, and Khlong Hoi Khong.

The northeastern part of the district is on the shore of the Songkhla Lake.

Administration
The district is divided into 13 sub-districts (tambons), which are further subdivided into 98 villages (mubans). The city (thesaban nakhon) Hat Yai covers tambon Hat Yai. There are four towns (thesaban mueang): Ban Phru covers parts of tambon Ban Phru, and Khlong Hae, Khuan Lang and Kho Hong each cover tambons of the same names. There is further one township (thesaban tambon). Pha Tong covers parts of tambon Pha Tong. The non-municipal areas are administered by nine tambon administrative organizations (TAO).

Missing numbers are tambons which now form districts Bang Klam and Khlong Hoi Khong.

References

Districts of Songkhla province